Danelle D’Aquanni Umstead (born February 15, 1972) is an American alpine skier and Paralympian.

She is part of the US Paralympics team. She competed at the women's slalom, giant slalom, downhill, Super-G and combined at the 2010 Winter Paralympics in Vancouver, with her husband Rob Umstead as her sighted guide. They took the bronze medal at the downhill and combined. She also competed in the 2014 Winter Paralympics in Sochi, winning a bronze medal in the super combined. She competed in the 2018 Winter Paralympics in Pyeongchang the downhill, slalom, giant slalom, super-g, and the super combined.

She has a genetic eye condition called retinitis pigmentosa.

On September 12, 2018, Umstead was announced as one of the celebrities being on season 27 of Dancing with the Stars. Her professional partner was Artem Chigvintsev.

References

External links
 Team Vision4Gold - Official website of Danelle and Rob Umstead
 Danelle Umstead at the U.S. Paralympic Team
 
 

1972 births
Living people
Alpine skiers at the 2010 Winter Paralympics
People from Taos, New Mexico
Paralympic bronze medalists for the United States
Paralympic alpine skiers of the United States
Sportspeople from New Mexico
American female alpine skiers
Medalists at the 2014 Winter Paralympics
Medalists at the 2010 Winter Paralympics
Participants in American reality television series
Paralympic medalists in alpine skiing
21st-century American women